| tries = {{#expr:
  + 4 + 9 + 6 + 3 + 7 + 5
  + 1 + 2 + 5 + 8 + 4 + 5
  + 5 + 3 + 8 + 3 + 10 + 6
  + 4 + 5 + 7 + 6 + 6 + 3
  + 6 + 4 + 8 + 1 + 3 + 2
  + 7 + 8 + 10 + 5 + 7 + 8
  + 4 + 6 + 3 + 7 + 7 + 3
  + 7 + 3 + 5 + 5 + 6 + 3
  + 3 + 5 + 9 + 7 + 6
 + 3 + 7 + 7 + 8 + 8 + 6
 + 4 + 3 + 4 + 3 + 6 + 1
 + 5 + 8 + 4 + 1 + 3 + 1
 + 3 + 10 + 2 + 5 + 6 + 1
 + 3 + 8 + 8 + 7 + 2 + 8
 + 10 + 2 + 7 + 5 + 7 + 8
 + 5 + 6 + 11 + 6 + 8 + 7
 + 3 + 5 + 1 + 9 + 7 + 4
 + 5 + 5 + 9 + 6 + 6 + 2
 + 4 + 6 + 6 + 4 + 9 + 2
 + 7 + 7 + 9 + 5 + 3 + 2
 + 6 + 5 + 7 + 4 + 7 + 6
 + 4 + 9 + 4 + 7 + 3 + 1
 + 5 + 3 + 9
}}
| top point scorer = 
| top try scorer = Steff Evans (Scarlets)(11 tries)
| website = www.pro14rugby.org/
| prevseason = 2015–16
| nextseason = 2017–18 Pro14
}}

The 2016–17 Pro12 (also known as the Guinness Pro12 for sponsorship reasons) was the sixteenth season of the professional rugby union competition originally known as the Celtic League, and the seventh with a four-country format. It was the third season to be referred to as the Guinness Pro12.

The twelve competing teams were the four Irish teams: Connacht, Leinster, Munster and Ulster; two Italian teams: Treviso and Zebre; two Scottish teams: Edinburgh and Glasgow Warriors and four Welsh teams: Cardiff Blues, Newport Gwent Dragons, Ospreys and Scarlets.  The first stage involved the 12 teams playing home and away in a league format with the top four sides qualifying for the semi-finals.  The semi-finals were one-off matches with 1st playing 4th and 2nd playing 3rd, with the higher ranked team receiving home advantage. The winners of the semi-finals proceeded to the Pro 12 final which was played at the Aviva Stadium on 27 May 2017.	
The final was contested by Scarlets and Munster with Scarlets winning 46-22.

Teams

Changes for the season

Ireland
Reigning champions Connacht started the season with a new coaching team. Backs and kicking coach Andre Bell left his role to return to his family in New Zealand. Head performance analyst and assistant attack coach Conor McPhillips took over coaching of the backs, while the team's former head coach Eric Elwood took over as kicking coach. The close season also saw the departure of the side's all-time record try-scorer Fionn Carr, who scored 42 tries over two spells with the province. Connacht's homeground, the Galway Sportsground underwent renovations during the summer, with the addition of a seated stand increasing its capacity to 8,100.

Beaten finalists Leinster also saw changes to their backroom staff, with defence coach Kurt McQuilkin leaving the role for personal reasons in August 2016. Former  head coach Stuart Lancaster joined the province in the role of "senior coach" the following month as McQuilkin's replacement. Leinster also hired World Cup winning former  head coach Graham Henry as a consultant coach during the off-season. After taking over the captaincy when Kevin McLaughlin was forced to retire, Isa Nacewa was appointed as team captain on a permanent basis ahead of the season opener.

After finishing sixth in the previous season, Munster replaced much of their coaching staff. Head coach Anthony Foley remained part of the coaching team, with a focus on lineouts and the breakdown. Jerry Flannery was also retained in his role as scrum coach, while Felix Jones, who was forced to retire due to injury the previous season, joined the backroom team as a technical coach with a focus on attack. After CJ Stander deputised as captain for the previous season, Munster announced ahead of the season that Peter O'Mahony would reassume the role when he returned from injury. On 16 October 2016, Anthony Foley died suddenly in the Munster team hotel in Paris while on an away trip to play Racing 92 in the European Champions Cup.

Ulster announced in August 2016 that Rory Best would vacate the captaincy of the province. The  captain was replaced in his role by Andrew Trimble, the team's record try-scorer, and Rob Herring, who took on the role in Best's absence the previous season.

Italy
After sacking head coach Umberto Casellato during the course of the previous season, Benetton Treviso hired former  head coach Kieran Crowley as his replacement. Marius Goosen, who served as coach following Casellato's dismissal, stayed with the side as Director of Rugby, the role he held before replacing Casellato.

After finishing ahead of Treviso in the previous season, Zebre played in top level European competition for the first time since the tournament format was changed at the end of the 2013–14 season. Zebre had the highest amount of changes to their squad in the competition with a total of 29 players either joining or departing the first team.

Scotland
After discussions of a possible move from Murrayfield to Easter Road in 2015 did not come to fruition, it was announced in May 2016 that Edinburgh had agreed a partnership with George Watson's College and would play their home fixtures at the school's 6,000 capacity Myreside venue in the second half of the season. It was also announced that the team would have the option of returning to Murrayfield for larger games. Edinburgh had previously used the ground as a home in its early years as a professional side and had played a home match there as recently as the 2015 Six Nations Championship. The off-season saw the loss of team captain Mike Coman, who left to join London Irish. With his departure, Grant Gilchrist and Stuart McInally took on the role in a joint capacity. On 28 September 2016, just four games into the season, Alan Solomons resigned as the team's head coach. The departure saw assistant coach Duncan Hodge promoted to acting head coach.

It was announced in October 2016 that this would be Gregor Townsend's last year in charge of Glasgow Warriors as he would depart at the end of the season to take up the role of  head coach. After serving as the team's sole captain in 2015–16, Jonny Gray shared the role with Henry Pyrgos for the season. Following issues with the playing surface at the team's home stadium, Scotstoun, an artificial playing surface was installed at the ground.

Wales
This was the Welsh Regions' first full domestic season under a revised arrangement with the WRU.

Cardiff Blues head coach Danny Wilson made seven signings for next season with Kirby Myhill, George Earle and Steven Shingler joining from the Scarlets, Rhys Gill from Saracens, Nick Williams from Ulster, Matthew Morgan from Bristol and Willis Halaholo from the Hurricanes.

Newport Gwent Dragons parted company with director of rugby Lyn Jones and began the season with his long-time assistant Kingsley Jones promoted to head coach. Wales international Taulupe Faletau left the Dragons for Bath Rugby in the off-season. The season ended with Newport shareholders voting to pass ownership of the Dragons and the Rodney Parade ground to the WRU.

The Ospreys added Bradley Davies, Hugh Gustafson and former Scarlets forwards Rhodri Jones and Rob McCusker to their playing staff. Meanwhile Brad Davis joined the coaching group under Steve Tandy.

Scarlets entered their third season under head coach Wayne Pivac. The off-season saw the return of former player Jonathan Davies following a spell at Clermont Auvergne. Other new signings included Rhys Patchell, Werner Kruger and Jonathan Evans, while New Zealander Johnny McNicholl arrived later in the season.

Table

Match summary
Teams play each other twice, once at home and once away.

Rounds 1 to 22
All times are local.

Round 1

Round 2

Round 3

After 40 minutes of play, the match was "abandoned due to adverse weather conditions causing considerable risk to both the players and spectators". Zebre were leading 22–10 (3 tries to 1) when the match was abandoned. The game was rescheduled for 1 April 2017.

Round 4

Round 5

Round 6

Round 7

Round 8

Round 9

Postponed prior to kickoff due to frozen pitch.  Game rescheduled on 11 March 2017.

Round 10

Round 11

1872 Cup 1st round

Round 12

Round 13

Round 14

Round 15

Round 16

Round 17

Round 9 rescheduled match

Game rescheduled from 25 November 2016.

Round 18

Round 3 rescheduled match

Game rescheduled from 17 September 2016.

Round 19

Round 20

Judgement Day

Round 21

Round 22

1872 Cup 2nd round

Play-offs

Semi-finals
The top four teams at the end of the league rounds meet in the semi-finals in a 1st v 4th and 2nd v 3rd format with the 1st and 2nd teams playing at home.

Final

Attendances

By club

Includes semi-finals but not final at Aviva Stadium.  Updated 21 May 2017.

End-of-season awards

Pro12 Dream Team

Award winners

Leading scorers
Note: Flags to the left of player names indicate national team as has been defined under World Rugby eligibility rules, or primary nationality for players who have not yet earned international senior caps. Players may hold one or more non-WR nationalities. Correct as of 8 May 2017.

Top points scorers

Top try scorers

Top try assists scorers

Notes

References

External links
 
 2016–17 Pro12 at ESPN

 
 
2016-17
2016–17 in Irish rugby union
2016–17 in Italian rugby union
2016–17 in Scottish rugby union
2016–17 in Welsh rugby union